The Authority Role-Playing Game is a role-playing game published by Guardians of Order in 2004.

Description
The Authority Role-Playing Game is based on Warren Ellis's The Authority comic book. The game uses Silver Age Sentinels as a foundation, but features a much higher power level, and uses twelve-sided dice (d12) as its main action resolution.

Publication history
The Authority Role-Playing Game was published by Guardians of Order in 2004.

Reception

Reviews
Pyramid

References

BESM/dX
Canadian role-playing games
Guardians of Order games
Role-playing games based on comics
Role-playing games introduced in 2004